Indigo is a novel written by Alice Hoffman, published by Scholastic in 2002.

Plot 

Oak Grove is a dry, dusty town haunted by memories of a past flood. Everyone dreads the water – except two brothers, Trevor and Eli McGill. Nicknamed Trout and Eel for their darting quickness and the mysterious webbing between their fingers and toes, the boys dream of the farthest seas and of a magical past they barely remember.

Martha Glimmer, the boys’ loyal friend, has her own reasons to help them reach their hearts’ desire. She's running away from her own memories – of her mother's death, her father's grief, and of the time before her heart was broken.

Little do Martha, Trout and Eel know that running away will lead them on a journey back to their own true natures.

References

External links
 

2002 American novels
American fantasy novels